Ignavigranum ruoffiae is a Gram-positive and facultatively anaerobic bacteria from the family of Ignavigranum which has been isolated from a human wound in the United States.

References

Bacteria described in 1999
Lactobacillales